WWT Washington Wetland Centre is a wetland reserve managed by the Wildfowl and Wetlands Trust at Washington, Tyne and Wear, North East England. 

Established in 1975, its wildlife includes swans, geese, ducks, a family of Asian short clawed otters and a flock of Chilean flamingos. WWT works towards the conservation of wetlands and has a successful breeding program for some of the world's most endangered wildfowl.

Included in the site is a nature reserve with hides to watch the wildlife, a saline lagoon and dragonfly ponds in which large species of dragonfly live along with newts, frogs and toads.

The park sells bags of seed that can be used to get an up-close and personal encounter with most of their birds whilst feeding them.

Species kept at the park include:
Andean goose
Baer's pochard
Black necked swan
Black swan
Chilean flamingo
Common crane
Eider
Hawaiian goose
Mute swan
Red-breasted goose
Ringed teal
Spur-winged goose
White-faced whistling duck

References

External links

Washington
Tourist attractions in the City of Sunderland
Nature reserves in Tyne and Wear
Washington, Tyne and Wear
Nature centres in England